Thomas Ernest Hulme (16 September 1883 – 28 September 1917) was an English critic and poet who, through his writings on art, literature and politics, had a notable influence upon modernism. He was an aesthetic philosopher and the 'father of imagism'.

Early life

Hulme was born at Gratton Hall, Endon, Staffordshire, the son of Thomas and Mary Hulme.  He was educated at Newcastle-under-Lyme High School and, from 1902, St John's College, Cambridge, where he read mathematics, but was sent down in 1904 after rowdy behaviour on Boat Race night. He was thrown out of Cambridge a second time after a scandal involving a Roedean girl. He returned to his studies at University College London, before travelling around Canada and spending time in Brussels acquiring languages.

Proto-modernist

From about 1907 Hulme became interested in philosophy, translating works by Henri Bergson and sitting in on lectures at Cambridge. He translated Georges Sorel's Reflections on Violence. The most important influences on his thought were Bergson, who asserted that 'human experience is relative, but religious and ethical values are absolute' and, later, Wilhelm Worringer (1881–1965), German art historian and critic – in particular his Abstraktion und Einfühlung (Abstraction and Empathy, 1908). Hulme was influenced by Remy de Gourmont's aristocratic concept of art and his studies of sensibility and style. From 1909 Hulme contributed critical articles to The New Age, edited by A. R. Orage.
 
Hulme developed an interest in poetry and wrote a small number of poems. He was made secretary of the Poets' Club, attended by such establishment figures as Edmund Gosse and Henry Newbolt. There he encountered Ezra Pound and F. S. Flint. In late 1908 Hulme delivered his paper A Lecture on Modern Poetry to the club. Hulme's poems "Autumn" and "A City Sunset", both published in 1909 in a Poets' Club anthology, have the distinction of being the first Imagist poems. A further five poems were published in The New Age in 1912 as The Complete Poetical Works of T. E. Hulme. Despite this misleading title, Hulme in fact wrote about 25 poems totalling some 260 lines, of which the majority were possibly written between 1908 and 1910. Robert Frost met Hulme in 1913 and was influenced by his ideas. The publisher of the book 'Ripostes' (to which Pound appended the 'complete' poetical works of T. E. Hulme) spoke in that book of Hulme 'the meta-physician, who achieves great rhythmical beauty in curious verse-forms.'

In his critical writings Hulme distinguished between Romanticism, a style informed by a belief in the infinite in man and nature, characterised by Hulme as "spilt religion", and Classicism, a mode of art stressing human finitude, formal restraint, concrete imagery and, in Hulme's words, "dry hardness". Similar views were later expressed by T. S. Eliot. Hulme's ideas had a major effect on Wyndham Lewis (quite literally when they came to blows over Kate Lechmere; Lewis ended the worse for it, hung upside down by the cuffs of his trousers from the railings of Great Ormond Street). He championed the art of Jacob Epstein and David Bomberg, was a friend of Gaudier-Brzeska, and was in on the debut of Lewis's literary magazine BLAST and vorticism.

Hulme's politics were conservative, and he moved further to the right after 1911 as a result of contact with Pierre Lasserre, who was associated with Action Française.

First World War

Hulme volunteered as an artilleryman in 1914 and served with the Honourable Artillery Company and later the Royal Marine Artillery in France and Belgium. He kept up his writing for The New Age. Notable publications during this period for that magazine were "War Notes", written under the pen name "North Staffs", and "A Notebook", which contains some of his most organised critical writing. He was wounded in 1916. Back at the front in 1917, he was killed by a shell at Oostduinkerke near Nieuwpoort, in West Flanders.

[...] On 28 September 1917, four days after his thirty-fourth birthday, Hulme suffered a direct hit from a large shell which literally blew him to pieces. Apparently absorbed in some thought of his own he had failed to hear it coming and remained standing while those around threw themselves flat on the ground. What was left of him was buried in the Military Cemetery at Koksijde, West-Vlaanderen, in Belgium where—no doubt for want of space—he is described simply as 'One of the War poets'."

Works

 Notes on Language and Style (1929, University of Washington Book Store); in The Criterion, Vol. 3, No. 12, (July 1925) (ed. Herbert Read)
 Speculations: Essays on Humanism and the Philosophy of Art (1936, K. Paul, Trench, Trubner & Co., Ltd.), edited by Herbert Read
 Further Speculations of T. E. Hulme (1955, University of Minnesota), edited by Samuel Hynes
 The Collected Writings of T. E. Hulme (1996, OUP), edited by Karen Csengeri
 Selected Writings of T. E. Hulme (2003, Fyfield Books), edited by Patrick McGuinness

Selected poems

 Above the Dock
 Autumn
 A City Sunset
 Conversion
 The Embankment
 Mana Aboda
 The Man in the Crow's Nest
 Susan Ann and Immortality
 The Poet
 A Tall Woman
 A Sudden Secret
  In the Quiet Land
 At Night!
 Town Sky-line

As translator

 Henri Bergson, An Introduction to Metaphysics, (1912)
 Georges Sorel, Reflections on Violence, (1915)

Articles

 "Belated Romanticism," The New Age, Vol. IV, No. 17, 1909.
 "The New Philosophy," The New Age, Vol. V, No. 10, 1909.
 "Bergson and Bax," The New Age, Vol. V, No. 13, 1909.
 "Searchers after Reality: Bax," The New Age, Vol. V, No. 14, 1909.
 "Searchers after Reality: Haldane," The New Age, Vol. V, No. 17, 1909.
 "A Note on 'La Foi'," The New Age, Vol. V, No. 27, 1909.
 "Searchers after Reality: Jules De Gaultier," The New Age, Vol. VI, No. 5, 1909.
 "Notes on the Bologna Congress," The New Age, Vol. VIII, No. 26, 1911.
 "Bergsonism in Paris," The New Age, Vol. IX, No. 8, 1911.
 "Bax on Bergson," The New Age, Vol. IX, No. 14, 1911.
 "Notes on Bergson," The New Age, Vol. IX, No. 25, 1911.
 "Notes on Bergson II," The New Age, Vol. IX, No. 26, 1911.
 "Mr. Balfour, Bergson, and Politics," The New Age, Vol. X, No. 2, 1911.
 "Notes on Bergson III," The New Age, Vol. X, No. 4, 1911.
 "Notes on Bergson IV," The New Age, Vol. X, No. 5, 1911.
 "Notes on Bergson V," The New Age, Vol. X, No. 17, 1912.
 "Mr. Epstein and the Critics," The New Age, Vol. XIV, No. 8, 1913.

 "German Chronicle", Poetry and Drama, Vol. II, 1914.
 "Modern Art: The Grafton Group," The New Age, Vol. XIV, No. 11, 1914.
 "Modern Art: A Preface Note and Neo-Realism," The New Age, Vol. XIV, No. 15, 1914.
 "Modern Art: The London Group," The New Age, Vol. XIV, No. 21, 1914.
 "Modern Art: Mr. David Bomberg's Show," The New Age, Vol. XV, No. 10, 1914.
 "The Translator's Preface to Sorel's 'Reflections on Violence'," The New Age, Vol. XVII, No. 24, 1915.
 "War Notes," The New Age, Vol. XVIII, No. 2, 1915 (as North Staffs).
 "War Notes," The New Age, Vol. XVIII, No. 3, 1915 (as North Staffs).
 "War Notes," The New Age, Vol. XVIII, No. 4, 1915 (as North Staffs).
 "War Notes," The New Age, Vol. XVIII, No. 5, 1915 (as North Staffs).
 "A Notebook," The New Age, Vol. XVIII, No. 5, 1915.
 "War Notes," The New Age, Vol. XVIII, No. 6, 1915 (as North Staffs).
 "A Notebook," The New Age, Vol. XVIII, No. 6, 1915.
 "War Notes," The New Age, Vol. XVIII, No. 7, 1915 (as North Staffs).
 "A Notebook," The New Age, Vol. XVIII, No. 7, 1915.
 "War Notes," The New Age, Vol. XVIII, No. 8, 1915 (as North Staffs).
 "A Notebook," The New Age, Vol. XVIII, No. 8, 1915.
 "War Notes," The New Age, Vol. XVIII, No. 9, 1915 (as North Staffs).
 "War Notes," The New Age, Vol. XVIII, No. 10, 1916 (as North Staffs).
 "A Notebook," The New Age, Vol. XVIII, No. 10, 1916.

 "War Notes," The New Age, Vol. XVIII, No. 11, 1916 (as North Staffs).
 "War Notes," The New Age, Vol. XVIII, No. 12, 1916 (as North Staffs).
 "War Notes," The New Age, Vol. XVIII, No. 13, 1916 (as North Staffs).
 "A Notebook," The New Age, Vol. XVIII, No. 13, 1916.
 "War Notes," The New Age, Vol. XVIII, No. 14, 1916 (as North Staffs).
 "War Notes," The New Age, Vol. XVIII, No. 15, 1916 (as North Staffs).
 "A Notebook," The New Age, Vol. XVIII, No. 15, 1916.
 "War Notes," The New Age, Vol. XVIII, No. 16, 1916 (as North Staffs).
 "War Notes," The New Age, Vol. XVIII, No. 17, 1916 (as North Staffs).
 "War Notes," The New Age, Vol. XVIII, No. 18, 1916 (as North Staffs).
 "The Note-Books of T. E. Hulme," The New Age, Vol. XXX, No. 12, 1922.
 "The Note-Books of T. E. Hulme: II," The New Age, Vol. XXX, No. 13, 1922.
 "The Note-Books of T. E. Hulme: III," The New Age, Vol. XXX, No. 15, 1922.
 "The Note-Books of T. E. Hulme: IV," The New Age, Vol. XXX, No. 16, 1922.
 "The Note-Books of T. E. Hulme: Bergson's Theory of Art," The New Age, Vol. XXX, No. 22, 1922.
 "The Note-Books of T. E. Hulme: Bergson's Theory of Art, II", The New Age, Vol. XXX, No. 23, 1922.
 "The Note-Books of T. E. Hulme: Bergson's Theory of Art, III", The New Age, Vol. XXX, No. 24, 1922.

Notes

Further reading

 Beasley, Rebecca (2007). Theorists of Modernist Poetry. T. S. Eliot, T. E. Hulme, Ezra Pound. London: Routledge. 
 Belgion, Montgomery (1927). "In Memory of T. E. Hulme," The Saturday Review, Vol. IV, No. 10, pp. 154–155.
 Brookner, Jewel Spears, (1984). T. E. Hulme and Irving Babbitt: An Annotated Bibliography. New York: Garland.
 Coffman, Stanley K., Jr. (1951). Imagism: A Chapter for the History of Modern Poetry. University of Oklahoma Press.
 Collin, W. E. (1930). "Beyond Humanism: Some Notes on T. E. Hulme," The Sewanee Review, Vol. 38, No. 3, pp. 332–339.
 Comentale, Edward P.; Andrzej Gasiorek (2013). T. E. Hulme and the Question of Modernism. Aldershot: Ashgate Publishing, Ltd.
 Csengeri, K. E. (1982). "T. E. Hulme's Borrowings from the French," Comparative Literature, Vol. 34, No. 1, pp. 16–27.
 Eliot, T. S. (1932). Selected Essays, 1917-1932. London: Faber and Faber.
 Epstein, Jacob (1955). "T.E. Hulme and his Friends." In: Epstein: An Autobiography. New York: E.P. Dutton & Company, pp. 59–62.
 Ferguson, Robert (2002). The Short Sharp Life of T. E. Hulme. London: Allen Lane
 Flint, F. S. (1915). "The History of Imagism," The Egoist, Vol. II, No. 5, pp. 70–71.
 Hadjiyiannis, Christos (2013). "Ezra Pound, T. E. Hulme, Edward Storer: Imagism as Anti-Romanticism in the Pre-Des Imagistes Era". In: Imagism: Essays on its Initiation, Impact and Influence. Ed. John Gery, Daniel Kempton, and H. R. Stoneback, The University of New Orleans Press, pp. 35–46.
 Harmer, J. B. (1975). Victory in Limbo: Imagism 1908-1917. London: Secker & Warburg.
 Hoeres, Peter (2003). "T. E. Hulme - Ein konservativer Revolutionär aus England", in: Zeitschrift für Politik, 50, pp. 187–204.
 Hughes, Glenn, (1931). Imagism and the Imagists. Stanford, CA.: Stanford University Press.
 Jones, Alun (1960). The Life and Opinions of T. E. Hulme. London: Victor Gollancz.
 Kamerbeek, Jr., J. (1969). "T. E. Hulme and German Philosophy: Dilthey and Scheler," Comparative Literature, Vol. 21, No. 3, pp. 193–212.
 Kishler, Thomas C. (1976). "Original Sin and T. E. Hulme's Aesthetics," Journal of Aesthetic Education, Vol. 10, No. 2, pp. 99–106.
 Kuhn, Elizabeth (2011). "Toward an Anti-Humanism of Life: The Modernism of Nietzsche, Hulme and Yeats," Journal of Modern Literature, Vol. 34, No. 4, pp. 1–20.
 Levenson, Michael H. (1984). A Genealogy of Modernism. A Study of English Literary Doctrine 1908-1922. Cambridge University Press. 
 Litz, A. Walton (2000). Modernism and the New Criticism. Cambridge University Press.
 Nott, Kathleen (1954). "Mr. Hulme's Sloppy Dregs." In: The Emperor Clothes. London: William Heinemann Ltd., pp. 56–104.
 Orage, A. R. (1920). "Readers and Writers," The New Age, Vol. XXVII, No. 17, pp. 259–260.
 Paige, D. D. (1951). The Letters of Ezra Pound, 1907-1941. London: Faber and Faber. 
 Rackin, Phyllis (1967). "Hulme, Richards, and the Development of Contextualist Poetic Theory," The Journal of Aesthetics and Art Criticism, Vol. 25, No. 4, pp. 413–425.
 Rae, Patricia (1997). The Practical Muse. Pragmatist Poetics in Hulme, Pound, and Stevens. Bucknell University Press. 
 Read, Herbert (1953). "The Isolation of the Image: T.E. Hulme." In: The True Voice of Feeling. London: Faber & Faber, pp. 101–115.
 Roberts, Michael (1938). T. E. Hulme. London: Faber & Faber (Rep. by Carcanet Press, 1982).
 Salter, K. W. (1965). "Traherne and a Romantic Heresy." In: Thomas Traherne: Mystic And Poet. New York: Barnes and Noble, Inc., pp. 130–135.
 Schuchard, Ronald (2003). "Did Eliot Know Hulme? Final Answer," Journal of Modern Literature, Vol. 27(1/2), pp. 63–69. 
 Shusterman, Richard (1985). "Remembering Hulme: A Neglected Philosopher-Critic-Poet," Journal of the History of Ideas, Vol. 46, No. 4, pp. 559–576.
 Tatham, Jr., Lewis Charles (1965). "T. E. Hulme." In: Shelley and his Twentieth-Century Detractors. (M.A. Thesis) University of Florida.
 Tigani, Francesco (2016). "Fra immaginazione e realtà: dalla critica del Romanticismo alla teologia politica negli scritti di Thomas Ernest Hulme e Carl Schmitt'", Información Filosófica, XIII, pp. 91–110.
 Tindall, William York (1955). The Literary Symbol. Columbia University Press.
 Wilhelm, J. J. (2010). Ezra Pound in London and Paris, 1908–1925. Penn State Press 
 Williams, Raymond (1960). "T. E. Hulme." In: Culture & Society 1780-1950. New York: Doubleday & Company, Inc., pp. 205–210.

External links

 
 
 
 Critical discussion of Hulme's work, including texts of 16 poems (Univ. of Southern Denmark)
 List of manuscript and typescript poems, etc. held at Keele University Library
 Romanticism and Classicism
 A Note on the Art of Political Conversion
 ‘A Definite Meaning’: The Art Criticism of T. E. Hulme
 The Evolution of T. E. Hulme's Thought
 T. E. Hulme: The First Conservative of the Twentieth Century
 Hulme Reconsidered and Reappreciated

1883 births
1917 deaths
Military personnel from Staffordshire
Alumni of St John's College, Cambridge
Alumni of University College London
Royal Marines officers
Royal Marines personnel of World War I
British military personnel killed in World War I
Imagists
English literary critics
People from Endon
People educated at Newcastle-under-Lyme School
English male poets
20th-century English poets
20th-century English male writers
English male non-fiction writers
British Army personnel of World War I
Honourable Artillery Company officers